Berezhok is a rural locality (a village) in Novlenskoye Rural Settlement, Vologodsky District, Vologda Oblast, Russia. The population was 7 in 2002.

Geography 
Berezhok is located 47 km northwest of Vologda (the district's administrative centre) by road. Pokrovskoye is the nearest rural locality.

References 

Rural localities in Vologodsky District